The Big Falls Inn, also known as Upper Mesa Falls Lodge, is located near Island Park, Idaho.  It was built in 1907.
It is on the western bank of Henrys Fork at Upper Mesa Falls in the Targhee National Forest.

It is a one-and-a-half-story log building on a concrete foundation.

References

Hotel buildings on the National Register of Historic Places in Idaho
Commercial buildings completed in 1907
Fremont County, Idaho